James Brown Noble, Jr. (born August 14, 1963) is a former American football wide receiver in the National Football League for the Washington Redskins and the Indianapolis Colts.  He played college football at Stephen F. Austin State University.

1963 births
Living people
People from Jacksonville, Texas
American football wide receivers
Stephen F. Austin Lumberjacks football players
Washington Redskins players
Indianapolis Colts players
National Football League replacement players